HD 175289 is a binary star system. Its primary star, also known as Kepler-410A, is a F-type subgiant star, orbited by the orange dwarf star Kepler-410B on a wide orbit. The companion star was discovered in 2012.

The primary star's surface temperature is 6325 K. HD 175289 is similar to the Sun in its concentration of heavy elements, with a metallicity Fe/H index of 0.01, but is much younger at an age of 1.81 billion years.

Planetary system
In 2013, one planet, named , was discovered using the transit method. It is not known if the planet is orbiting the primary or secondary star. If orbiting the secondary, the planetary radius must be doubled. Immediately, a second non-transiting planet was suspected due to transit-timing variations, and a 2019 study also found evidence for such a planet, though it has not yet been confirmed or given any designation.

References

Lyra (constellation)
Planetary transit variables
F-type subgiants
K-type main-sequence stars
Planetary systems with one confirmed planet
Binary stars
J18523616+4508233
0042
175289
BD+44 3008